Dong-Sung Cho, (born 1949) is a Korean educator and scholar.

He is recognized for his research in the areas of business strategy, sustainability, and national competitiveness.

Early life and education

A native of Seoul, Dong-Sung Cho graduated from Seoul National University with a Bachelor of Business Administration degree and earned his doctoral degree in Business Administration from Harvard Business School. Upon graduation, he worked at Gulf Oil for 2 years before becoming the youngest professor at Seoul National University.

Career

From 1978 to 2014, Dong-Sung Cho was Professor of Strategy and International Business at Seoul National University, serving as the Dean of the SNU College of Business Administration (2001-2003) and the Dean of the Graduate School of International and Area Studies (1999-2001). From 2014 to 2016, he served as Professor of Strategy at the Cheung Kong Graduate School of Business (CKGSB), an American modeled business school in Beijing, China. From 2016 to 2020, he served as President of Incheon National University.

From 2017 to 2019, Dr. Cho served as the president of the Federation of University Presidents representing 32 regional universities in Gyeonggi Province and Incheon City. From 2018 to 2020, he was Chairman of the Korean University Accreditation Institute which is given the authority by the Ministry of Education to accredit 190 universities in Korea every 5 years.

He was a Visiting Professor at Harvard Business School, University of Michigan, Boston University, Duke University, INSEAD in France, Helsinki School of Economics and Business Administration (now Aalto University), University of Sydney, the University of Tokyo, Hitotsubashi University, Peking University, Zhejiang University and Nankai University.

Currently he is Professor Emeritus of Strategy & International Business at Seoul National University and Chairman of the Institute for Industrial Policy Studies (IPS) in Korea. IPS carries out empirical studies on worldwide industrial policies and has published annual reports on national brand valuations since 2000. Additionally, he is the 2nd President of the Hanseatic League of Universities (HLU), an alliance of more than 100 universities worldwide. Under his leadership, HLU launched a new university ranking system called WURI (World’s Universities with Real Impact) in 2019, and co-presents the annual rankings with the United Nations Institute for Training and Research (UNITAR), the Taylor Institute of Franklin University Switzerland (TIFUS), and The Institute for Policy and Strategy on National Competitiveness (IPSNC).

He also serves as Board Director of the Korea Professional Football League, Chairman of the Board of the National Nature Trust, Honorary Consul General of Finland in Seoul and Honorary Chairman of the Institute of K-Brand Promotion.

Development and research

Dong-Sung Cho developed his mechanism-based view (MBV) theory as a new way of looking at strategic management theory differentiating from the aspects of resource-based theories of Jay Barney or Michael Porter. Cho’s model, Ser-M is considered to provide a holistic view of organizational strategy.

Publications

Cho published 115 academic papers in major journals. Among the 70 books that he authored or coauthored, 19 are in English and 5 in Chinese. He also has written 3 novels.

Awards and honors

In 2007, he received the Order of Service Merit - Yellow Stripes award from the government of Korea. He has been voted as “The #1 Management Guru” in Korea by Maeil Economic Daily. In 2015, the President of Finland awarded him The Knight, First Class of the Order of the White Rose of Finland.

Cho received honorary doctoral degrees from Inje University, Busan in 2007 and Aalto University, Helsinki in 2011.

References

Academic staff of Seoul National University
Seoul National University alumni
Harvard Business School alumni
Living people
1949 births